Kerala Law Academy (KLA), also referred to as the Kerala Law Academy Law College, is a self financing law college in Thiruvananthapuram, Kerala, India. Founded in 1967, it is the first, and was for many years the only, self financing law institution in the state. It is accredited by the Bar Council of India. and affiliated to the University of Kerala. 

KLA has both the three-year and the five-year LL.B programs (under the graduate stream of study) and the LL.M and M.B.L programs (under the  post-graduate stream of study). The college has an active Moot Court Society and students of the society has also participated in various competitions held outside India. KLA also conducts a legal aid clinic to provide legal assistance to members of the underprivileged sections of the society.

History
Kerala Law Academy was registered as a society on 17 October 1966 and inaugurated on 21 October 1967. In 1968, the college started functioning under the University of Kerala in the same year.

Notable alumni
 K. Balakrishnan Nair
 Raja Vijayaraghavan V.
 Murali (Malayalam actor)
 Mukesh (actor)
 Balachandra Menon
 M. Swaraj
 John Brittas
 C. S. Sujatha
 K. Muraleedharan
 A. A. Rahim (politician)
 V. D. Satheesan
 Devi Ajith
 Mithun Ramesh
 K. N. Balagopal
 Anil Panachooran
 K. Rajan (politician)
 Binoy Viswam
 G. R. Anil
 K. K. Ragesh
 Prabha Varma
 Kadannappalli Ramachandran
 Anoop Jacob
 V. S. Sunil Kumar
 V. K. Prasanth
 Simon Britto Rodrigues
 Shanimol Usman
 P. V. Kunhikrishnan
 V. S. Sivakumar
 K. Suresh Kurup
 M. Vincent
 A. M. Ariff
 V. Sivankutty
 V. G. Arun
 Anil K. Narendran
 Joy Thomas
 K. Vinod Chandran
 K. P. Rajendran
 Thomas Unniyadan
 Eldhose Kunnappilly

Controversy
In January 2017, students of the institute protested and launched a strike against what was described as "anomalies in the allocation of internal marks and inhuman treatment to students and even caste discrimination". Matters escalated as students claimed they were denied permission to organize a solidarity protest against Nehru College of Engineering and Research Centre, where a student committed suicide following alleged harassment by the college management. Protests turned violent and 15 cops were injured during a protest march. The students accused principal Lekshmi Nair, who is also a celebrity cook and television anchor, of not devoting enough time to the academic affairs of the college and later demanded her resignation. Lekshmi Nair denied all allegations in a press conference. The Syndicate of Kerala University has decided to send a committee to check the situation and as the committee submitted their report, the Syndicate decided to debar Lekshmi Nair from conduct of exam work for the next five years. Following the committee report, both big parties in the congress decided to support the students in their struggle. Soon after this, a criminal case was registered against Lekshmi Nair under the SC / ST Prevention of Atrocities Act for harassing a student by calling him by his caste name. As protests entered their fourth week, the Government of Kerala ordered a probe into land utilisation issues by the college. The land owned by Kerala Law Academy a society, was allotted by the state government intended for educational purpose only. The profit gathered from the law college was used to buy a property near Kerala government secretariat  trivandrum and used as residential commercial flats. NIA identified gold scam concerned with Swapna Suresh and others used these flats for conspiracy. The issues came out after this incident again. To appease the students, the management of the college has decided to remove Lekshmi Nair from her post, but agitation continues as students demanded Lekshmi Nair's resignation. Demands were made to cancel the Kerala University affiliation but these were denied by the university. Protests continued until the state government guaranteed the students they would not let the management reinstate Lekshmi Nair. The criminal case against Lekshmi Nair was withdrawn four months later.

See also
Government Law College, Thiruvananthapuram
Colleges in Trivandrum
List of educational institutions in Kerala

References

Law schools in Kerala
Colleges in Thiruvananthapuram
Educational institutions established in 1967
1967 establishments in Kerala